Protosiren is an extinct early genus of the order Sirenia.  Protosiren existed throughout the Lutetian to Priabonian stages of the Middle Eocene. Fossils have been found in the far-flung locations like the United States (South Carolina, North Carolina and Florida), Africa (Egypt), Europe (France, Germany and Hungary) and Asia (India and Pakistan).

So far, five species have been named. From comparative anatomy and chronological order, it has been suggested that P. fraasi, P. sattaensis and P. smithae represent an ancestor-descendant lineage. P. eothene is the oldest and smallest species.

Ecology

Like the extant sirenians (manatee and dugong), Protosiren is thought to have fed on sea grasses as well as freshwater plants.  Unlike extant sirenians, Protosiren had hind limbs.  Although the limbs were well-developed, they were small and the sacroiliac joint was weak.  Consequently, Protosiren is thought to have been only or primarily aquatic, rarely venturing on to land. It has been speculated that it swam by caudal undulation and used its hind limbs to crawl along sea floors in nearshore habitats while feeding. It might have occupied a different ecological niche than the contemporary Eotheroides, which had a closer resemblance to modern sirenians.

See also

Evolution of sirenians

References

Domning, D. P.; Morgan, G. S.; Ray, C. E. (1982). North American Eocene sea cows (Mammalia: Sirenia). Smithsonian Contributions to Paleobiology Number 52. Smithsonian Institution Press, Washington, D.C.

External links
 Protosiren at The Paleobiology Database.

Eocene sirenians
Transitional fossils
Prehistoric placental genera
Taxa named by Othenio Abel
Fossil taxa described in 1904